Acoptus is a genus of true weevils in the family of beetles known as Curculionidae. There is one described species in Acoptus, A. suturalis, found in the northeastern United States and southeastern Canada. It can commonly be found near beaver dams.

References

Further reading

 
 
 

Curculionidae
Articles created by Qbugbot
Beetles of North America